The Simpsons is an American animated sitcom created by Matt Groening for the Fox Broadcasting Company. It is a satirical depiction of a dysfunctional middle-class American lifestyle starring the eponymous family: Homer, Marge, Bart, Lisa, and Maggie. Set in the town of Springfield, the show lampoons both American culture and the human condition. The family was conceived by Groening shortly before a pitch for a series of animated shorts with producer James L. Brooks. Groening named each character (other than Bart) after members of his own family. The shorts became part of the Fox series The Tracey Ullman Show on April 19, 1987. After a three-season run, the sketch was developed into a half-hour primetime hit show.

 The show holds several American television longevity records. It is the longest-running primetime animated series and longest-running sitcom in the United States. With its 21st season (2009–10), the series surpassed Gunsmoke (which had 20 seasons) to claim the spot as the longest-running American primetime scripted television series, and later also surpassed Gunsmoke (which had 635 episodes) for episode count in this category, starting with the 29th-season episode "Forgive and Regret" on April 29, 2018.

Episodes of The Simpsons have won dozens of awards, including 31 Emmys (ten for Outstanding Animated Program), 30 Annies, and a Peabody. The Simpsons Movie, a feature-length film, was released in theaters worldwide on July 26 and 27, 2007, and grossed US$526.2 million worldwide. The first 20 seasons are available on DVD in regions 1, 2, and 4, with the twentieth season released on both DVD and Blu-ray in 2010 to celebrate the 20th anniversary of the series. On April 8, 2015, showrunner Al Jean announced that there would be no more DVD or Blu-ray releases, shifting focus to digital distribution, although this was later reversed on July 22, 2017. Almost two years later, on July 20, 2019, it was announced that Season 19 would be released on December 3, 2019, on DVD.

On March 3, 2021, The Simpsons was renewed for seasons 33 and 34. On February 19, 2012, The Simpsons reached its 500th episode in the 23rd season. It reached its 600th episode on October 16, 2016, in its 28th season. On March 21, 2021, The Simpsons reached its 700th episode in its 32nd season. 

Season 34 premiered on Fox on September 25, 2022.

On January 26, 2023, The Simpsons was renewed for seasons 35 and 36.

Tracey Ullman Shorts

Series overview

Seasons 1–11 are ranked by households (in millions).
Seasons 12–33 are ranked by total viewers (in millions).

Notes
 Until the 1996–97 television season, ratings were calculated over 30 weeks from September to mid-April. Episodes that aired after mid-April were not part of the overall average and ranking.
 Season one had approximately 13.4 million viewing households. Season two dropped 9%, resulting in an average of approximately 12.2 million viewing households.
 Season three had an average rating of 13.0 points. For the 1991–92 season, each point represented 921,000 viewing households, resulting in a total average of approximately 12.0 million viewing households.
 Season four had approximately 12.1 million viewing households. Season five dropped 13%, resulting in an average of approximately 10.5 million viewing households.

List of episodes

Seasons 1–20 (1989–2009)

Seasons 21–present (2009–present)

Film

Shorts

Theatrical

Disney+

Miscellaneous

Specials

Ratings

With its first season, The Simpsons became the Fox network's first series to rank among the top thirty highest-rated shows of a television season. Due to this success, Fox decided to switch The Simpsons timeslot in hopes of higher ratings for the shows airing after it. The series moved from 8:00 p.m. eastern time on Sundays to the same time on Thursdays, where it competed with The Cosby Show, the number-one show at the time.

Many of the producers were against the move, as The Simpsons had been in the top ten while airing on Sunday, and they felt the move would destroy its ratings. Ratings-wise, new episodes of The Cosby Show beat The Simpsons every time during the second season, and The Simpsons eventually fell out of the top ten. At the end of the season, Cosby averaged as the fifth-highest-rated show on television, while The Simpsons was thirty-eighth.

The show continued in its Thursday timeslot until the sixth season, which is when, in 1994, it reverted to its original slot on Sunday. It has remained there ever since.

References

External links

Lists of American adult animated television series episodes
Lists of American sitcom episodes
 
Episodes